Compilation of all the well documented national flag proposals of several countries, dependent territories, autonomies, international organisations, and states with limited recognition.

An asterisk in headings denotes an incomplete list, which has more proposals not in Wikimedia Commons yet.

Åland

Algeria

Angola

Antarctica

Armenia

Aruba

Australia

Bahamas

Belarus

Belgium

Bermuda

Bolivia

Bosnia and Herzegovina*

Brazil

Bulgaria

Cameroon

Canada

Cape Verde

Cayman Islands

Central African Republic

Chile

China, People's Republic of 

See "List of Chinese Flags/ Flag Proposals"

Chuvashia

Colombia

Congo, Democratic Republic of the

Congo, Republic of the

Cook Islands

Costa Rica

Crimea

Croatia*

Cyprus

Czech Republic

Earth

East Timor

Egypt

Estonia*

European Union

Fiji

Finland

France

French Guiana

Germany*

Ghana

Greenland

Guinea-Bissau

Guyana

Hong Kong

Hungary

Iceland

India

Iraq

Ireland

Israel*

Ivory Coast

Jamaica

Karelia

Kazakhstan

Komi

Korea, North

Kosovo*

Kuwait

Kyrgyzstan

Latvia*

Lithuania

Luxembourg

Macau

Malaysia

Mexico

Moldova

Montenegro

Mozambique

Myanmar

Namibia

Nauru

Nepal

New Caledonia

New Zealand 
See "2015–2016 New Zealand flag referendums" and "New Zealand flag debate"

Nigeria

North Macedonia*

Norway 

Dependent Territories

Okinawa

Pakistan

Palestine

Panama

Papua New Guinea

Peru*

Philippines

Portugal*

Romania

Russia

Rwanda

Réunion

Sahrawi Arab Democratic Republic

Samoa

São Tomé and Príncipe

Serbia

Slovakia*

Slovenia*

Solomon Islands*

South Africa 
See "List of South African Flags/Proposed Flags"

Spain

Suriname

Taiwan

Tajikistan

Tanzania

Tatarstan

Togo

Tokelau

Turkmenistan

Ukraine

United Kingdom

United Nations

Uzbekistan

Vietnam

Vojvodina

References

Sources 

History of flags
National flags
Proposed flags